The Philadelphia Liberty FC is a North American professional soccer team based in West Chester, Pennsylvania, United States. Founded in 2006, the team plays in Women's Premier Soccer League (WPSL), a national amateur league at the fourth tier of the American Soccer Pyramid.

The Liberty's home is John A. Farrell Stadium, located on the campus of West Chester University in the Philadelphia suburb of West Chester, where they have played since 2006.  The team is owned by Team Dynamics LLC, a highly successful organization dedicated to soccer education and player development at all age levels, which also operates the Atlantic City Diablos and Central Delaware SA Future.  The team's colors are orange and black.  Prior to the 2007 season, the team was known as the Philadelphia Pirates. In 2009, Team Dynamics LLC became Philadelphia Women's Pro Soccer LLC, and the Philadelphia Independence of Women's Professional Soccer began competing under its ownership in 2010. Also in 2010, the WPSL Philadelphia Liberty were renamed the Philadelphia Independence, meaning that Philadelphia Women's Pro Soccer LLC now operates two teams named the Philadelphia Independence, one in WPS and one in the WPSL.

Players

Current roster

Year-by-year

Honors

Competition history

Coaches
  Wayne Grocott (2007)

  Seamus O'Connor (2009–present)

Home stadiums
 John A. Farrell Stadium (2006–present)

External links
 Official Site
 WPSL Philadelphia Liberty page

   

Women's Premier Soccer League teams
Women's soccer clubs in the United States
Soccer clubs in Pennsylvania
L
Amateur soccer teams in Pennsylvania
2006 establishments in Pennsylvania
Association football clubs established in 2006
Women's sports in Pennsylvania